Melech Schachter (April 7, 1913 - February 27, 2007) was a pulpit rabbi, coordinator of Jewish divorce, and instructor at Yeshiva University for over fifty years.

Life

Education
Schachter was born in Suceava, in the Duchy of Bukovina, several years before the city became part of Romania. He studied at the Viznitz Yeshiva, and arrived in America as a teenager, at the age of fifteen. After receiving his bachelor's degree from Yeshiva College and semikha from Rabbi Moshe Soloveitchik, he also received a Ph.D. from Dropsie College in Philadelphia. His doctoral dissertation discussed the variant versions of the Mishnah between the Babylonian Talmud and the Jerusalem Talmud and was eventually published by Mossad HaRav Kook.

Career
Schachter served many rabbinic roles over his career, including the publit rabbi in various communities such as Scranton, Pennsylvania, and The Bronx, New York. He went on to serve as the coordinator of the Rabbinical Council of America's Beth Din for Gittin (Jewish Divorce) and Halitza. In addition to teaching in the RIETS Semikha program, he also taught at Stern College for Women and the Wurzweiler School of Social Work. In 1997, Rabbi Norman Lamm granted him an honorary degree for his achievements as a Torah scholar and rabbi. Schachter consulted with Rabbi Moshe Feinstein on a number of issues regarding Gittin and Geirut, such as the use of a polygraph by a husband who is fully paralyzed to commission the writing of a Get and relying on a pregnancy test to allow a woman who converts to Judaism to marry immediately. He was an expert on the spelling of names in a Get and was often consulted by younger rabbis on issues of Halacha and gave generously of his time to train them.

Death
Schachter died at the age of 93 on February 27, 2007, and was survived by his son Hershel Schachter, daughter Sara Steinberg, twelve grandchildren, and thirty-three great grandchildren. He was originally going to be eulogized in the Harry Fischel Beit Midrash at Yeshiva University, but, due to underestimated attendance, the eulogies were moved to the adjacent Lamport Auditorium and the deceased was brought in, as well.

Legacy
Schachter would often relate at family gatherings the following story as told by his grandson Rabbi Shay Schachter:

Published works
 HaMishnah HaBavli vehaYerushalmi, hashva'at nuschaoteha, Mossad HaRav Kook, Jerusalem, 1959
 Tziyun leNefesh Haya, a responsum regarding commissioning the writing of a Get via telephone, published in Kevod HaRav page 268 and Eretz HaTzvi page 271
 PRACTICAL HALAKHAH IN THE SPACE AGE, Tradition: A Journal of Orthodox Jewish Thought, Vol. 2, No. 1 (FALL 1959), pp. 155–163
 "Various Aspects of Adoption," The Journal of Halacha and Contemporary Society vol. 4, no. 2 (Fall 1982): 93:115
 Lectures and articles on YUTorah.org

References

Further reading and links 
 Hesped for Rabbi Melech Schachter
 An Irritating Name in a Get - Rav Melech Schachter’s zt”l Resolution of a Tense Situation by Rabbi Chaim Jachter
 Rabbi Melech Schachter

Yeshiva University rosh yeshivas
20th-century American rabbis
Bukovina Jews
People from Suceava
1913 births
2007 deaths